The Caparo T1 is a British mid-engine, rear-wheel drive, two-seat automobile that was built by Caparo Vehicle Technologies, founded by design director Ben Scott-Geddes, engineering director Graham Halstead, engineers formerly involved in the development of the McLaren F1 and Sean Butcher, marketing director and financier. The T1 was inspired by Formula One design, and intended as a relatively affordable road legal racing car. The T1 was scheduled for production in mid-2007 for a price of £235,000 with approximately 25 cars per year built.

Overview

Exterior
The exterior of the T1 closely resembles that of a racing prototype or Formula One racing car. The wings are replaceable with road and track variations.

Interior
The interior of the T1 is a two-seat configuration, lacking any amenities and luxuries to reduce excess weight. The passenger's seat is set back from the driver's seat slightly, allowing the seats to be placed closer together, thereby reducing the overall width of the T1. Offered are a head protection system, six-point harnesses for the driver and passenger, compatible with a HANS device, and is designed with a central safety cell made of a high-strength steel roll hoop with a fire system. The dashboard is multi-function with race data logging and speed sensors for traction control and launch control.

Chassis

The chassis of the T1 is composed of a carbon fibre and aluminium honeycomb monocoque with a front composite crash structure and a rear tubular space frame construction. The suspension is of a double wishbone design with tunable anti-roll bars, front and rear, and five-way adjustable race dampers. The braking system is composed of  metal brake discs, with six-piston and four-piston callipers front and rear, respectively. The brake bias pedal box is fully adjustable and brake pads are available in various compounds. The wheels are all-aluminium  and  front and rear, respectively, with Pirelli P Zero Corsa tyres. Magnesium  and  wheels front and rear, respectively, with Pirelli slick and wet track tyres are available as optional equipment.

Powertrain
The engine has gone through several designs, previously including a smaller 2.4-litre supercharged unit. In addition, the engine has been reported to successfully reach  on methanol fuel. The engine is controlled via a fully tunable Pectel SQ6 engine control unit and the throttle is controlled via a throttle-by-wire system.

The T1's gearbox is a 6-speed Hewland sequential, made of a magnesium and carbon construction, that has a variety of available gear ratios, and utilizes a pneumatic actuator to shift; able to upshift in 60 milliseconds and downshift in 30 milliseconds.  Furthermore, the drivetrain incorporates a limited-slip differential and equal-length hollow tripod driveshafts.

Performance
From a standing start, it has an estimated  time under 2.5 seconds and onto  in 4.9 seconds, depending on tyre setup. It is also capable of an estimated lateral acceleration of up to 3 g and braking deceleration of 3 g, depending on tyre setup.

History

Unveiling

The T1 was officially unveiled by Albert II, Prince of Monaco, joined by Murray Walker, at the Top Marques auto show in Monaco on 20 April 2006. The show car unveiled was a prototype, painted orange as historic McLaren cars were due to the nature of the T1's designers being ex-McLaren engineers. Another test vehicle was reported to have been under construction at the time.

During the MPH '07 auto show, on 30 October through 2 November and later 13 November through 16 November 2007, Caparo, in conjunction with the London Metropolitan Police, unveiled a prototype police vehicle variant of the T1 named the Rapid Response Vehicle (RRV). However, Top Gear and Edmunds reported that the car would not be put into production.

Incidents
Jason Plato was injured in a prototype T1 in October 2007 at the Bruntingthorpe proving ground when it caught fire at an estimated . The T1 was being tested during filming for Five's Fifth Gear. Plato described what happened as:

In the associated episode of Fifth Gear, first broadcast 15 October 2007, presenter Vicki Butler-Henderson suggested the fire was caused by a "faulty oil sealing component," which, having been identified, has been fully rectified by Caparo.

While being tested for competing for British television programme Top Gear, first broadcast on 11 November 2007, a floor panel came loose from the test vehicle as it was being driven at speed by Jeremy Clarkson, after he had already made a play of being scared about driving the car because of Plato's experience. Afterwards, there was a problem with the car's petrol injection system. In the same review, Clarkson mentioned two more incidents, one at the press launch, when "some aspect of the front suspension came adrift" while a Dutch journalist was driving, causing him to veer off-road, and one at the Goodwood Festival of Speed when the throttle stuck open.

Reviews
On 11 November 2007, the T1 surpassed the Top Gear Power Board leader's time of 1:17.6, then held by the Koenigsegg CCX, with a time of 1:10.6.  Immediately after having declared the time and placed it on the Power Board, presenter Jeremy Clarkson removed the record because it did not meet the show's rule that the car must be able to go over a speed bump. However, Ben Scott-Geddes of Caparo has stated that, "the model we supplied to Top Gear was one of our final engineering vehicles without adjustable ride height and electronic active driver control systems which are standard on our production models. When drivers select the 'road' setting, the car is more tractable in slower speed conditions and the ride height is fully adjustable to bring the car up to 90 mm clearance, making it more than capable of driving over speed bumps."

When driving the Caparo, Clarkson had stated that limited aerodynamic downforce is created at slow speeds, saying that it would be an excellent excuse for a policeman since "[he] has to take that corner at a thousand mph because if [he] takes it at thirty, [he'll] crash." The car had low levels of lateral traction while cornering if it was not being driven rapidly. Aerodynamically, this vehicle is designed such that air passing over the body at high speed "pushes" the vehicle against the road (allowing for higher cornering speeds). He criticized the handling characteristics, finding that the vehicle was difficult to control around corners at low speeds and that on a wet or cold day (these factors negatively affect grip) there were problems even at higher speeds.

Sales
Caparo planned to sell around 25 cars per year.  However, in the production run they sold just 15 cars before the company fell into administration in 2015, with the completed cars and owners locations unknown. A small number of T1's have appeared for sale following the companies collapse, one in Japan in 2019, and a further two that have been on sale in the United Kingdom since 2021.

References

Citations

External links

 Caparo T1 official web site.

2000s cars
Cars of England
Rear mid-engine, rear-wheel-drive vehicles
Sports cars